Otto ter Haar (9 August 1943 – 29 September 2016) was a Dutch field hockey player. He competed in the men's tournament at the 1968 Summer Olympics.

References

External links
 

1943 births
2016 deaths
Dutch male field hockey players
Olympic field hockey players of the Netherlands
Field hockey players at the 1968 Summer Olympics
Sportspeople from Hilversum
20th-century Dutch people